Timo Kern (born 16 January 1990) is a German professional footballer who plays as an attacking midfielder for German club Bayern Munich II. He began his career with Karlsruher SC and made his debut for the club in September 2010, as a substitute for Timo Staffeldt in a 2–0 defeat to FSV Frankfurt in the 2. Bundesliga.

Career statistics

References

External links

Living people
1990 births
Association football midfielders
German footballers
Karlsruher SC players
Karlsruher SC II players
FC Astoria Walldorf players
SV Waldhof Mannheim players
FC Bayern Munich II players
2. Bundesliga players
3. Liga players
Regionalliga players